Guilty by Association is a 2003 American action crime drama film written by Howard Gibson, directed by Gibson and Po Johns and starring Jeff Edward and Daemon Moore and features Morgan Freeman in a small role.  The film also features Bryce Wilson in his acting debut.  Co-director Po Johns also appears in the film, playing dual roles.  Due to marketing/publicity reasons, Freeman appears on the cover of the DVD release.

Cast
Jeff Edward as Drama
Daemon Moore as D-Mo
Morgan Freeman as Police Lieutenant Redding
Bryce Wilson as Kenny
Po Johns as Dumb Donald and Po
Jammie Patton as Nikki

Release
The film was released via direct-to-DVD on July 22, 2003.

Reception
TV Guide gave the film a negative review: "Freeman must have been drawn to this project's sincerity, but even his magisterial presence can't lend depth to such a clumsily constructed cautionary tale."

Andy Patrizio of IGN scored the film a 4 out of 10 and wrote, "The bottom line is there's nothing we haven't seen before, and done better."

References

External links
 
 

2000s English-language films